Wishes: A Holiday Album is the third Christmas album and twelfth studio album by saxophonist Kenny G. It was released by Arista Records on October 22, 2002, and peaked at number 1 on the Contemporary Jazz chart, number 2 on the Contemporary Jazz Albums chart, number 29 on the Billboard 200, number 34 on the R&B/Hip-Hop Albums chart and number 64 on the Internet Albums chart.  It was the second best-selling Christmas album in the US for 2002 with sales of 501,000 copies for the year.

Track listing
"Deck the Halls / The Twelve Days of Christmas" (Traditional) - 3:01
"Hark! The Herald Angels Sing / O Come All Ye Faithful" (Felix Mendelssohn/Charles Wesley/John Francis Wade/Frederic Oakeley) - 4:37
"Joy to the World" (Lowell Mason/Isaac Watts) - 2:29
"God Rest Ye Merry Gentlemen" (Traditional) - 4:34
"Rudolph the Red-Nosed Reindeer / Frosty the Snowman" (Johnny Marks/Steve Nelson/Jack Rollins) - 5:21
"Wishes" (Walter Afanasieff/Kenny G) - 3:59
"Do You Hear What I Hear?" (Noel Regney/Gloria Shayne) - 3:08
"Cantique de Noel (O Holy Night)" (Adolphe Adam) - 4:27
"Jesus, Joy of Man's Desiring" (Johann Sebastian Bach) - 2:07
"Auld Lang Syne (Freedom Mix)" (Robert Burns/Traditional) - 4:53

Personnel 
 Kenny G – arrangements, soprano saxophone (1-4, 6-10), tenor saxophone (5)
 Walter Afanasieff – keyboard programming (1-4, 6-9), rhythm programming (1-4, 6-10), arrangements (1, 2, 3, 8, 9, 10), keyboards (10), synthesizers (10), drum programming (10)
 John Binder – programming (1-4, 6-9)
 Greg Bieck – programming (2, 4), digital programming (10), Macintosh programming (10), additional drum and rhythm programming (10)
 Robert Conley – programming (2, 3, 4, 7, 8, 9)
 Greg Phillinganes – keyboards (5)
 Randy Waldman – acoustic piano (5)
 Frank Maranzino – programming (6)
 Dave Foxx – additional synthesizers (10), additional drum programming (10)
 Ramón Stagnaro – nylon guitar (6)
 Nathan East – bass (5)
 Vinnie Colaiuta – drums (5)
 Paulinho da Costa – percussion (5)
 William Ross – orchestral arrangements and conductor (1, 2, 4, 6, 10)
 Harvey Cohen – horn and orchestral arrangements (5)
 Jorge Calandrelli – orchestral arrangements and conductor (7, 8)
 Matthew Delapolla – scoring consultant (1, 2, 4, 5, 6)
 Debbie Datz-Pyle – orchestra contractor (1, 2, 4-8, 10)
 Patti Zimmitti – orchestra contractor (10)

Production 
 Kenny G – producer, liner notes 
 Antonio L.A. Reid – executive producer 
 Dave Foxx – audio collage producer and arrangements (10)
 Lou Simon – audio collage producer and arrangements (10)
 Steve Shepherd – engineer (1-4, 6-9)
 Nick Thomas – engineer (1, 6), assistant engineer (2, 3, 4, 8)
 David Gleeson – engineer (2, 4, 10)
 Humberto Gatica – engineer (5, 6, 10), orchestra engineer (6), mixing (10)
 David Reitzas – engineer (6)
 Cesar Ramirez – assistant engineer (1, 7, 9)
 Chris Brooke – assistant engineer (5, 10)
 Brian Dixon – assistant engineer (6)
 Nick Marshall – assistant engineer (6)
 Peter Doell – assistant engineer (10)
 Mark Eshelman – assistant engineer (10)
 Pete Krawiec – assistant engineer (10)
 Grant Schmitz – assistant engineer (10)
 Bill Smith – Pro Tools engineer (1, 2, 4, 5, 7, 8)
 Joe Wohlmuth – Pro Tools engineer (5-9)
 Al Schmitt – orchestra engineer (1, 2, 4, 5, 7, 8)
 John Rodd – orchestra recordist (7, 8)
 Mick Guzauski – mixing (1-9)
 George Spatta – mix assistant (1-9)
 Vlado Meller – mastering 
 Tom Steel – stage manager (7, 8)
 Damon Tedesco – stage manager (7, 8)
 Rich Davis – production coordinator for Walter Afanasieff 
 Joe Mama-Nitzberg – creative director 
 Courtney Walter – art direction, design 
 Lyndie Benson – photography 
 Dennis Turner – management 
 Turner Entertainment Group, Inc. – management company

Studios
 Recorded at WallyWorld Studios (Marin County, CA); Studio G (Malibu, CA); Westlake Studios and Signet Sound Studios (Los Angeles, CA); Sony Pictures Studios (Culver City, CA).
 Orchestra recorded at Sony Scoring Stage (Culver City, CA); Paramount Recording Studios (Hollywood, CA); 20th Century Fox Studios (Los Angeles, CA).
 Mixed at Barking Dog Studios (Mount Kisco, NY); WallyWorld Studios.
 Mastered at Sony Music Studios (New York, NY).

Singles
Information taken from this source.

Year-end charts

References

Arista Records Christmas albums
Kenny G albums
2002 Christmas albums
Christmas albums by American artists
Jazz Christmas albums